In Another Life may refer to:

Music
 In Another Life (album), by Bilal, 2015
 In Another Life, an album by Active Child, 2020
 "In Another Life", a song by Ashlee Simpson from I Am Me, 2005
 "In Another Life", a song by the Darkness from Easter Is Cancelled, 2019
 "In Another Life", a song by Emin Agalarov, 2013
 "In Another Life", a song by XTC from Wasp Star (Apple Venus Volume 2), 2000
 "The One That Got Away" (Katy Perry song), originally titled "In Another Life", 2011

Television
 "In Another Life" (The Outer Limits), an episode
 "In Another Life", an episode of The Eleventh Hour

See also 
 Another Life (disambiguation)
 "In Another Lifetime", a song by the Desert Rose Band, 1990